Menaka is a 1955 Indian Tamil language film directed by V. C. Subburaman. It is a remake of the 1935 film of the same name, in turn based on the novel of the same name by Vaduvur Duraisami Iyengar. The film stars K. R. Ramasamy and Lalitha. The film was released on 5 January 1955, and emerged a critical and commercial failure.

Plot 

The story is about a loving couple getting separated by designs of evil doers. However, after many sufferings, they reunite.

Cast 
List adapted from the database of Film News Anandan and from the Hindu review article.

Male cast
K. R. Ramasamy
K. Sarangapani
T. K. Ramachandran
D. Balasubramaniam
Acharya
Friend Ramasami
T. N. Sivathanu
M. S. Karuppaiah
T. V. Sethuraman
V. P. Balaraman
V. P. S. Mani

Female cast
Lalitha
Ragini
C. K. Saraswathi
M. S. S. Bhagyam
K. S. Angamuthu
Indira
S. K. Venubai
K. S. Adilakshmi
K. S. Rajam
K. S. Chandra

Dance
Padmini
Kushalakumari

Production 
This is the second edition of the same story by Vaduvur Duraisami Iyengar that he first published as a novel. Then it was staged as a successful play by TKS Brothers. It was made into a film in 1935 with the same title. K. R. Ramasamy who featured in a supporting role in the 1935 edition, was the hero in this 1955 edition.

The film was produced and directed by V. C. Subburaman. Screenplay and dialogues were written by A. T. Krishnaswamy. Cinematography was handled by P. Balasubramaniam, R. R. Chandran and M. S. Mani while the editing was done by B. V. M. V. Ramaraju was in charge of art direction while the choreography was done by V. Madhavan. Still photography was by R. N. Nagaraja Rao.

Soundtrack 
Music was composed by T. G. Lingappa, C. N. Pandurangan and Vedha while the lyrics were penned by Kannadasan, Ku. Sa. Krishnamoorthy, A. Maruthakasi, K. P. Kamatchisundaram, K. D. Santhanam and S. D. Sundharam.

Reception 
Menaka was poorly received by critics, and underperformed at the box office.

References

External links 
 

1955 drama films
1955 films
Films based on adaptations
Films based on Indian novels
Films scored by T. G. Lingappa
Indian drama films
Remakes of Indian films
1950s Tamil-language films
Films scored by Vedha (composer)
Films scored by C. N. Pandurangan